This article lists power stations in Mauritania. Energy is distributed by the national Mauritania Electricity Company (Somelec). Most energy comes from small distributed diesel generators, but grid-connected electricity is rapidly increasing, particularly renewable energy due to Mauritania's favorable wind and solar conditions. Mauritania exports surplus energy to Senegal and Mali while also benefiting from hydroelectric dams in Mali.

Thermal

Solar

Wind

See also 
 List of power stations in Africa
 List of largest power stations in the world
 Energy in Mauritania

References 

Mauritania
Power stations